"Money and the Power" is a song by American rapper Kid Ink, produced by N4, Ned Cameron and Jonathan Lauture. The song was released as the second single from his major label debut EP, Almost Home on May 28, 2013, and was later included on the deluxe edition of Ink's studio album My Own Lane. The song peaked at number 70 on the German Singles Chart and at 21 on the UK R&B Chart.

Music video 
On July 19, 2013, Kid Ink released a lyric video for "Money and the Power" via VEVO. On September 12, 2013, Kid Ink released the Los Angeles-shot music video via VEVO.

Performances 
Alongside Travis Barker and Skylar Grey, Kid Ink performed "Money and the Power" during WrestleMania 31 on March 29, 2015 at Levi's Stadium, as part of a medley with David Guetta and Skylar Grey's "Rise"—both songs having served as the theme music for the event.

Critical reception 
"Money and the Power" received generally positive reviews from music critics. DJBooth.net praised his sung-rap style, and named the song the most radio ready song from the album. Rick Florino of Artistdirect called the song a "irresistible cut" from Almost Home. Trent Fitzgerald of PopCrush called the song a "standout and a bombastic anthem that Kid Ink is famous for."

Chart performance

Certifications

Release history

References 

2013 singles
2013 songs
RCA Records singles
Kid Ink songs
Songs written by Kid Ink